Habul Chakraborty (1 February 1960 – 16 February 2020) was an Indian businessman and politician from Assam belonging to Indian National Congress. He was a legislator of the Assam Legislative Assembly.

Biography
Chakraborty was born on 1 February 1960 at Dhekiajuli in Sonitpur to Dilip Kumar Chakraborty and Chhaya Rani Chakraborty. He was elected as a member of the Assam Legislative Assembly from Dhekiajuli in 2011.

Chakraborty was married to Rupali Chakraborty on 2 May 1993. They had one son and one daughter.

Chakraborty died on 16 February 2020 at Tezpur Medical College and Hospital at the age of 60.

References

1960 births
2020 deaths
Assam MLAs 2011–2016
Businesspeople from Assam
Indian National Congress politicians from Assam
People from Sonitpur district